Aglona Parish is an administrative unit of Preiļi Municipality, Latvia. From 2009 until 2021, it was part of the former Aglona Municipality.

Towns, villages and settlements of Aglona Parish 
 Aglona

References

Preiļi Municipality
Parishes of Latvia
Latgale